Herbert Emil Schultze (24 July 1909 – 3 June 1987), was a German submarine commander during World War II. Schultze was a recipient of the Knight's Cross of the Iron Cross with Oak Leaves of Nazi Germany.

Early life and career
Schultze was born in Kiel. He joined the Reichsmarine on 1 April 1930. Schultze underwent a number of officer training courses at the Naval Academy at Mürwik before transferring to the German cruiser Leipzig (2 October 1933 – 7 October 1934). During this assignment, he was promoted to Oberfähnrich zur See (senior midshipman) on 1 April 1934 and to Leutnant zur See (acting sub-lieutenant) on 1 October 1934. In May 1937, now an Oberleutnant zur See, Schultze transferred to the U-boat force, taking command of the Type IIA U-boat  on 31 January 1938. U-2 was assigned to the U-Bootschulflottille (U-boat school flotilla); he spent the next year and a half training with the sub.

On 22 April 1939 Schultze commissioned , a Type VIIB U-boat. U-48 was later to become the most successful submarine of the war. She was assigned to the 7th U-boat Flotilla, and spent the next four months in training. On 1 June 1939 Schultze was promoted to Kapitänleutnant.

World War II
On 19 August 1939, on the eve of World War II, Schultze took U-48 out on her first patrol. On this patrol, which took U-48 to the North Atlantic, southwest of Ireland and to the Rockall Bank before returning to Kiel on 17 September, Leutnant zur See Reinhard Suhren served as 1st watch officer. U-48s 2nd watch officer on this patrol was Leutnant zur See Otto Ites.

He was at sea when the war started on 1 September 1939. On 11 September 1939 he sank the British  freighter Firby. After the sinking he sent the plain language radio message "cq - cq- cq - transmit to Mr. Churchill. I have sunk the British steamer "Firby". Posit 59.40 North and 13.50 West. Save the crew, if you please. German submarine." This message, addressed to the First Lord of the Admiralty Winston Churchill directly.

Schultze intercepted the freighter Browning some time later and ordered to pick up survivors from Royal Sceptre. Schultze's cease-fire action was on the provision that the British crew did not use their radios to report him. After returning to base, Schultze gave an interview to William L. Shirer, an American reporter, on 29 September 1939. The patrol yielded  of shipping.

The second patrol began on 4 October and ended 21 days later. During the sortie he sank  in 22 days.  From 12–17 October 1939, Schultze sank five ships. Tanker Emile Miguet, Heronspool  Louisiane , Sneaton  and  Clan Chisholm. Schultze abided by prize law in all but the sinking of Clan Chisholm which sailed in convoy HG 3. Nine men were killed aboard Schultze's first eight victims. During the attack he ordered the stern torpedo fired at a destroyer—probably HMS Escort—with no result. A number of the ships were photographed during their sinking by the German crew.

Schultze's third patrol lasted from 20 November to 20 December. The boat sank . The patrol lasted only seven days. Upon Schultze's departure from the Atlantic Ocean on 19 December there were no U-boats in the sea for five days.

Knight's Cross
In January 1940 B-Dienst intercepted British naval signals suggesting Ark Royal was a en route through the English Channel. Schultze was ordered to take up position at the Western end with two other boats—U-26 and U-37—and sink her. They were ordered to take up their stations on 12 February. Schultze, believing the other boats were joining him to attack a convoy he was shadowing, decided to stay with the convoy and ignored the orders of Befehlshaber der U-Boote (BdU). He proceeded to expend all but one torpedo and missed the carrier which docked in Portsmouth unmolested. Schultze received a mild reprimand by Dönitz. Schultze's fourth patrol yielded four more ships from 10–17 February 1940. Two Dutch ships and one Finnish ship accompanied the  Sultan Star, sunk on 14 February 1940. Schultze was  awarded the Knight's Cross of the Iron Cross for his successes on 2 March. He had sunk  of shipping.

On 9 April 1940 the Kriegsmarine executed Operation Weserübung. In support of the invasions of Norway and Denmark U-48 carried out combat operations against warships. On 14 April Schultze attacked the battleship Warspite but the torpedoes failed. U-25 made attacks against the battleship in Vestfjorden without success, and probably due to torpedo failure. In a third attack, U-47 commanded by Günther Prien attempted to sink the battleship but failed for the same reason. The widespread mechanical failures of torpedoes at this stage of the war threatened morale. Detailed reports were made to Dönitz. On 20 May 1940 Schultze handed command of U-48 over to Hans Rudolf Rösing due to illness stemming from a stomach and kidney disorder. Schultze was sent to a naval hospital to recuperate. From October 1940 Schultze became part of the naval staff of the 7th U-boat Flotilla, at St Nazaire, in France.

On 17 December 1940 Schultze resumed command of U-48, relieving Heinrich Bleichrodt. His resumption of combat operations coincided with the period known as the "First Happy Time." In the midst of his next patrol—6 February 1941—Hitler issued Directive 23. The order singled out the British sea lanes as a priority target for the navy and Luftwaffe.

On 20 January 1941 Schultze began his sixth patrol which ended on 17 February. Nicolas Angelos, a  ship, was sunk from convoy OB 279 on 1 February and Nailsea Lass,  followed from convoy SLS 64 23 days later. The convoy was attacked by Admiral Hipper and several other U-boats. A seventh patrol from 17 March–8 April 1941 resulted in four sinkings. Schultze intercepted HX 115 on 29 March and sank three ships. The Hylton , Germanic, and Limbourg, . In Schultze's eighth and penultimate patrol from 22 May–17 June 1941, he sank five ships. On 3 June Inversuir  from convoy OB 327, on the 5th Wellfield  from convoy OB 328, and on the 6th and 8th Tregarthen  and then Pendrecht  from convoy OB 329. Empire Dew  from convoy OG 64 was Schultze's final victim.

Ashore
Schultze was thus awarded the Oak Leaves to his Knight's Cross on 12 June 1941. The presentation was made on 30 June 1941 by Hitler at the Führer Headquarter Wolfsschanze (Wolf's Lair) in Rastenburg (now Kętrzyn in Poland).

On 27 July 1941 Schultze left U-48 to take command of the 3rd U-boat Flotilla operating from La Rochelle, also in France. He served in this capacity until March 1942, when he was assigned to the staff of Marinegruppe Nord as Admiral Staff Officer for U-boats. He was assigned to the staff of Admiral Karl Dönitz in December 1942. On 1 April 1943 he was promoted to Korvettenkapitän. In March 1944 he was assigned as commander of Department II, Marineschule Mürwik, where he served to the end of the war.

Post-war
In August 1945 he was employed by the Allies as commander of the Naval Academy at Mürwik near Flensburg and the Heinz Krey-bearing. In November 1945, now a civilian, he took the job of manager of the naval facilities in Flensburg-Mürwik until October 1946.

On 2 July 1956, Schultze joined the Bundesmarine of West Germany and served in a string of staff positions. His first disposition was commander of the 3rd Ship Home Department. He served in this capacity from 2 July 1956 to 15 February 1959. He then served as Staff Officer Personnel (A1) on the command staff of the naval base, was commander of convoy ships, teaching group leaders at the Naval Academy and head of the volunteer adoption headquarters of the Navy until his retirement on 30 September 1968 with the rank of Kapitän zur See. Schultze died on 3 June 1987 in London.

Awards
 Wehrmacht Long Service Award 4th Class (2 October 1936)
 Olympic Games Decoration (20 April 1937)
 Iron Cross (1939) 2nd Class (25 September 1939) & 1st Class (27 October 1939)
 Knight's Cross of the Iron Cross with Oak Leaves
 Knight's Cross on 1 March 1940 as Kapitänleutnant and commander of U-48
 15th Oak Leaves on 12 June 1941 as Kapitänleutnant and commander of U-48
 Croce di Guerra with Swords (14 October 1941)
 U-boat War Badge (1939) (25 October 1939), with Diamonds (15 July 1941)

References

Citations

Bibliography

 
 

 
 
 
 
 
 
 
 

1909 births
1987 deaths
Military personnel from Kiel
People from the Province of Schleswig-Holstein
Reichsmarine personnel
U-boat commanders (Kriegsmarine)
Recipients of the Knight's Cross of the Iron Cross with Oak Leaves
German Navy personnel
Kriegsmarine personnel of World War II
Recipients of the War Cross for Military Valor